The Brazil national rugby league team represents Brazil in the sport of rugby league. The nation made its international debut at the inaugural Latin American Rugby League Championship held in Los Ángeles, Chile in November 2017, losing to the hosts in their first international match. The team are currently ranked 41st as of November 2019, in the IRL World Rankings.

All-time results record

References

External links
http://www.brasilrl.com.br/

South American national rugby league teams
Rugby league
National rugby league teams